Krishan Bahadur Pathak (born 24 April 1997) is an Indian field hockey player who plays as a goalkeeper for the Indian national team.

Early life
Pathak was born on 24 April 1997 in Kapurthala, Punjab. He is of Nepalese descent; his parents migrated from a village in Nepal to Punjab in 1990. Despite not being interested in the sport, Pathak had joined the Surjit Hockey Academy in Jalandhar when he was 12 at the insistence of his father. Pathak's mother died when he was 12, while his father Tek Bahadur Pathak, a crane operator, died of a heart attack in 2016.

Career
Pathak was part of the Indian junior team that won the 2016 Men's Hockey Junior World Cup in Lucknow. He was then selected in the India A team for the 2017 Men's Australian Hockey League. He made his India senior team debut in January 2018 when the team participated in a four-team invitational tournament in New Zealand. Pathak found a place in the squad for 2018 Sultan Azlan Shah Cup as India's first-choice goalkeeper P. R. Sreejesh was rested. He then played as a reserve goalkeeper in the 2018 Men's Hockey Champions Trophy where India won the silver medal and the 2018 Asian Games where India won bronze.

Pathak was the reserve goalkeeper at the 2020 Olympic Games in Tokyo where India won the bronze medal.

References

External links
Krishan Pathak at Hockey India

1997 births
Living people
People from Kapurthala
Indian male field hockey players
Male field hockey goalkeepers
Field hockey players from Punjab, India
Indian people of Nepalese descent
Field hockey players at the 2018 Asian Games
2018 Men's Hockey World Cup players
Asian Games bronze medalists for India
Asian Games medalists in field hockey
Medalists at the 2018 Asian Games
Field hockey players at the 2022 Commonwealth Games
Commonwealth Games silver medallists for India
Commonwealth Games medallists in field hockey
2023 Men's FIH Hockey World Cup players
Medallists at the 2022 Commonwealth Games